Sir John Boris Roderick Hazan (3 October 1926 – 19 August 1988) was a British barrister and judge. He was appointed to the High Court of Justice in January 1988 and sat in the Queen's Bench Division, but died eight months later.

References 

1926 births
1988 deaths
British barristers
20th-century English judges
Queen's Bench Division judges
Place of birth missing
Knights Bachelor